The Maqamat al-Hariri is an illuminated manuscript created by Yahya ibn Mahmud al-Wasiti in 1237. The manuscript is currently kept in the Bibliothèque nationale de France in Paris.

Origin 
The manuscript is a collection of 50 tales or Maqamat written at the end of the 11th or the beginning of the 12th century by Al-Hariri of Basra, an Arab poet. According to its colophon, the manuscript was copied in the year 634 of the Islamic calendar (equivalent to 1237 in the Western calendar) by a copyist called Yahya ibn Mahmud al-Wasiti.

The miniatures 
The book is written in red and black ink, and supplemented by 99 miniatures. These miniatures depict a wide variety of scenes from the Maqamat and from every day life. Most are decorated with gold.

The style of the paintings is influenced by Indian art; one of the characteristics of Buddhist art represented in the miniatures is the use of protruding eyes. One miniature (depicted below) is directly inspired by India, showing an island with animals and trees from the region.

References

Notes

Sources

External links 
 
 Les Makamat de Hariri; exemplaire orné de peintures exécutées par Yahya ibn Mahmoud ibn Yahya ibn Aboul-Hasan ibn Kouvarriha al-Wasiti., online digitisation of the BnF manuscript

Arabic manuscripts
Islamic manuscripts
1237 works